Ian Baker Muir (16 June 1929 – 22 February 2009) was a Scottish footballer, who played as a centre half in the Football League.

References

External links

1929 births
2009 deaths
Scottish footballers
Footballers from Motherwell
Association football defenders
Motherwell F.C. players
Bristol Rovers F.C. players
Oldham Athletic A.F.C. players
Rhyl F.C. players
English Football League players
Thorniewood United F.C. players
Scottish Junior Football Association players